Shivli or Sheoli is a town and a nagar panchayat in Kanpur Dehat district in the Indian state of Uttar Pradesh.

Location
This town is located on Kanpur -Bela road(SH-68) at a distance 35 kilometer from city Kanpur towards north-west.

Transport

This town is connected in south via road with railway station Rura on North Central Railway line where fast and super fast train are available to west to Etawah, Agra, Delhi, Meerut and to east Kanpur.Allahabad, Patna.
This town is also connected by road Kanpur city in the east. It is linked with Rasulabad by road in the west and is connected to GT Road National High Way in north at Shivrajpur.

Religious place in Shivli

Jageshwar temple:It is an important religious center.
Shobhan temple:Hanuman temple (nearest)
Saket-Dham (Beautiful temple of god&goddess Krishna & Radha)
Manshila temple
Maa Pantha Devi Temple
Maa Athaiya Devi Temple
Maa Ishwari Devi Temple 
Baba Omkareshwar Dham Baidana Mohalla Birtiyana Shivli

Schools

Tara Chand Inter College  (Near Main Bus Stop)
Jai Jageshwar Inter college (Near The Jageshwar Temple)
Shri kanahiya lal babu ram vidya peeth high school
Foolkumari Inter college

Demographics
 India census, Shivli had a population of 10000. Males constitute 53% of the population and females 47%. Shivli has an average literacy rate of 69%, higher than the national average of 59.5%: male literacy is 75%, and female literacy is 62%. In Shivli, 15% of the population is under 6 years of age.

References

Cities and towns in Kanpur Dehat district